North East Derbyshire District Council elections are held every four years. North East Derbyshire District Council is the local authority for the non-metropolitan district of North East Derbyshire in Derbyshire, England. Since the last boundary changes in 2019, 53 councillors have been elected from 24 wards.

Political control
The first election to the council was held in 1973, initially operating as a shadow authority before coming into its powers on 1 April 1974. Since 1973 political control of the council has been held by the following parties:

Leadership
The leaders of the council since 2004 have been:

Council elections
1973 North East Derbyshire District Council election
1976 North East Derbyshire District Council election
1979 North East Derbyshire District Council election (New ward boundaries)
1983 North East Derbyshire District Council election
1987 North East Derbyshire District Council election (District boundary changes took place but the number of seats remained the same)
1991 North East Derbyshire District Council election (District boundary changes took place but the number of seats remained the same)
1995 North East Derbyshire District Council election (District boundary changes took place but the number of seats remained the same)
1999 North East Derbyshire District Council election
2003 North East Derbyshire District Council election (New ward boundaries)
2007 North East Derbyshire District Council election
2011 North East Derbyshire District Council election
2015 North East Derbyshire District Council election
2019 North East Derbyshire District Council election (New ward boundaries)

By-election results

1995-1999

1999-2003

2003-2007

2007-2011

2015-2019

2019-2023

References

By-election results

External links
North East Derbyshire Council

 
North East Derbyshire District
Council elections in Derbyshire
District council elections in England